Yanchengpu is a station on the Orange line of Kaohsiung MRT in Yancheng District, Kaohsiung, Taiwan.

Station overview
The station is a two-level, underground station with an island platform and four exits.

Station layout

Exits
Exit 1: Yancheng Elementary School, Shinkuchan Shopping District
Exit 2: Kaohsiung Museum of History, Kaohsiung Business Exhibition Center 
Exit 3: Yancheng Junior High School
Exit 4: Jhongsiao Elementary School

Around the station
 International Convention Center Kaohsiung
 Kaohsiung City Music Hall
 Kaohsiung Film Archive
 Kaohsiung Museum of History
 Love Pier
 Love River
 Pier-2 Art Center
 Shinkuchan Shopping District
 Kaohsiung Business Exhibition Center
 Kaohsiung Bridge

References

2008 establishments in Taiwan
Kaohsiung Metro Orange line stations
Railway stations opened in 2008